Colonel Barnard Charles Evans CMG (1847 – 31 December 1920), commonly written as Charles Barnard Evans, was Commissioner for Railways with the Queensland Government Railways from 1 June 1911 to 31 October 1918.

Biography
Evans was born in England; his father was a worker with the Great Western Railway. He started work for the same company.

Career in Australia
In 1884 he was appointed inspector of the southern and western divisions.
In 1885 he was appointed timetable clerk by J. T. Thallon, then in 1890 was promoted to traffic superintendent and in 1891 district traffic manager for Townsville and in 1894 the same position in Maryborough.
During this time he earned Thallon's thanks for his performance during a flood disaster, and a bonus for his expeditious organisation of a line duplication.
He became traffic manager, Townsville, in 1896; in 1901 the Commissioner's inspector for the northern division and in 1908 or 1909 succeeded Robert Dunbar as general traffic manager, Brisbane.
On 1 June 1911 he succeeded Thallon and (briefly) King as Commissioner, a position he held until his retirement in July 1918.

In 1914 he was awarded the distinction of CMG and the honorific title of Colonel.

During his time as commissioner, many large and important works were completed: sheds for rolling stock at Mayne, rearrangement of the facilities at Roma Street, Ipswich, South Brisbane, Toowoomba, Warwick, and Townsville, a new locomotive depot at Rockhampton, and a great deal of line duplication throughout the State.

His remains were interred at the Toowong Cemetery, alongside those of his wife.

Family
Evans married Mary Ann Thompson (died 6 March 1919); their children included:
Charles Evans
William Evans
George Henry Evans (1878–1923)
James A. Evans
Charles and William were in North Queensland at the time of his death and did not attend the funeral.
Louie Evans married Robert Henry Hogan in 1933
Lilian Evans married Peter Harold Curtis in 1907
Rene Evans
(Kate) Maud Evans (1881–1922)
They had a home, "Acland", at Adelaide Street, Clayfield

References 

1847 births
1920 deaths
Railway commissioners of Queensland